XEHK-AM is a radio station on 960 AM in Guadalajara, Jalisco, Mexico. It is owned by Grupo Radiorama and is known as HK, La Voz de Guadalajara, carrying a romantic format.

History
XEHK received its concession on June 29, 1939 and signed on the next year. It was owned by Carmen Villaseñor until 1945, when it was bought by Francisco E. Fregoso.

References

Radio stations in Guadalajara